The Namibia Ice and InLine Hockey Association (NIIHA) is the governing body of inline hockey in Namibia.

History
The NIIHA was founded and joined the International Ice Hockey Federation on 31 May 1998. It was an affiliate member of the IIHF until 19 May 2017, they withdrew from an IIHF membership and are no longer an IIHF member due to lack of standard ice rinks and ice hockey activities in the country. According to the congress, the IIHF decided to keep Chile as an affiliate member, but there are no new members at this congress. Namibia still maintain to play just inline hockey and as a member of the International Roller Sports Federation (now World Skate).

Statistics
416 players total
86 male players
225 junior players
105 female players
35 referees
5 inline rinks but no ice rinks exist
No longer an IIHF member

See also
Namibia national inline hockey team
Namibia women's national inline hockey team

References

Inline hockey in Namibia
Inline hockey